Deepak Gupta may refer to:

 Deepak Gupta (civil servant) (born 1951), former chairman of the Union Public Service Commission
 Deepak Gupta (judge) (born 1955), judge of the Supreme Court of India
 Deepak Gupta (attorney) (born 1977), American attorney
 Deepak Gupta (researcher), Indian researcher